That Book ...of Perfectly Useless Information, commonly abbreviated as "That Book" (the title it was published under in Britain) is a book written by writer Mitchell Symons, and published in 2003.

Book Trivia

Material
The book covers all sorts of material, but frequent topics are celebrities and other people, and their personal qualities, animals, calendar dates, years, toilets, songs, bands, and information normally in the form of lists.

Collection
In the acknowledgements for the book, Symons says: "For the past twenty years, I've been collecting weird and wonderful facts, which I've been storing on bits of paper and, more recently, on my computer. Every few years I'll use some of it in a book or a newspaper series, but it's always been my ambition to be able to put together the most fascinating, extraordinary facts I had-or could find-in one volume."

2003 non-fiction books
Trivia books
Bantam Press books